Burns Municipal Airport  is six miles east of Burns, in Harney County, Oregon. The National Plan of Integrated Airport Systems for 2011–2015 categorized it as a general aviation facility.

History
By 1929 an airport had been established at Burns.
In 1934, the Civil Works Administration awarded $5,000 to build a new airport. In 1942, the City of Burns purchased  for a new airport. During World War II, a squadron of P-38 Lightning were stationed at the Burns Airport.

West Coast DC-3s landed at Burns from 1959 until early 1967.

On January 7, 1981, three Bonneville Power Administration employees died when their airplane crashed as it approached the airport.

Facilities
Burns Municipal Airport covers 825 acres (334 ha) at an elevation of 4,159 feet (1,268 m). It has two runways: 12/30 is 5,100 by 75 feet (1,554 x 23 m) asphalt; 3/21 is 4,600 by 60 feet (1,402 x 18 m) concrete. The United States Bureau of Land Management operates a SEAT Base from the airport for fighting wildfires.

In the year ending August 30, 2010, the airport had 8,000 aircraft operations, average 21 per day: 84% general aviation, 15% air taxi, and 1% military. 17 aircraft were then based at the airport: 82% single-engine and 18% ultralight.

The airport is home to the Burns Interagency Fire Zone (BIFZ), fire aviation base, supporting initial attack helicopters and single engine air tankers (SEATS).

References

External links 

 Burns Municipal Airport
 Airport page at City of Burns website
 Aerial image as of May 1994 from USGS The National Map
 

Airports in Harney County, Oregon
Burns, Oregon